Elena Rybakina defeated Ons Jabeur in the final, 3–6, 6–2, 6–2 to win the ladies' singles tennis title at the 2022 Wimbledon Championships. It was her first major singles title. Rybakina became the first Kazakhstani to win a major title, and the third player representing an Asian nation to win a major title after Li Na and Naomi Osaka. She also became the first Kazakhstani to progress past the quarterfinals of a major. Rybakina was the first player to win from a set down in the final since Amélie Mauresmo in 2006.

Ashleigh Barty was the reigning champion, but retired from professional tennis in March 2022.

Jabeur became the first Arab to reach a major singles final, the first African woman to do so in the Open Era, and the first African woman to do so not representing South Africa. This marked the first time since 2009 that both finalists represented non-European nations.

World No. 1 Iga Świątek's win streak of 37 matches (dating to Qatar in February) ended when she was defeated by Alizé Cornet in the third round. It was only the fourth loss of her season, and her 37-match winning streak is the longest of the 21st century, and tied for 12th-longest in the Open Era.

For the second time in her career, Cornet defeated the incumbent world No. 1 in the third round at Wimbledon; she had defeated then-five-time champion Serena Williams at that stage in 2014. By making her 62nd consecutive major main draw appearance, Cornet matched Ai Sugiyama's all-time record. Williams received a wild card to play in the tournament, making her comeback to the sport after a year due to a right hamstring injury sustained the previous year, and this would be Williams's final appearance at the tournament. She competed for an all-time record-equaling 24th major singles title, but was defeated in the first round by Harmony Tan. Williams later announced her retirement from professional tennis at the US Open.

This is the first edition of Wimbledon to feature a champions tie-break, a 10-point tie-break when the score reaches six games all in the third set, and the third edition to feature a final set tie-break rule. The first women's singles main draw match of the tournament to feature the ten-point tie break was the first round match between Caroline Garcia and Yuriko Miyazaki, with Garcia emerging victorious.

Seeds
All seeds per WTA rankings.

Draw

Finals

Top half

Section 1

Section 2

Section 3

Section 4

Bottom half

Section 5

Section 6

Section 7

Section 8

Championship match statistics

Seeded players
The following are the seeded players. Seedings are based on WTA rankings as of 20 June 2022. Rankings and points are as before 27 June 2021.

The WTA is removing ranking points from the 2022 tournament as a result of the All England Club's decision to ban Russian and Belarusian players from the tournament. Points dropping from the 2021 tournament will accordingly be replaced by the player's next best result, regardless of her performance at Wimbledon in 2022.  Note that 2021 points were mandatory for WTA players, unlike for ATP players, who were subject to a different rankings adjustment system.

† Because the WTA is removing ranking points from the 2022 tournament, 2021 points will be replaced by the player's next best result instead.
‡ The player did not qualify for the tournament in 2021. Accordingly, no points will be replaced.
§ The player did not qualify for the tournament in 2021. She is defending points from two 2021 ITF tournaments (Montpellier and Contrexeville) instead.

Withdrawn players
The following players would have been seeded, but withdrew before the tournament began.

Banned players
The following players would have been seeded, but were not permitted to enter the tournament due to the decision to ban players from Russia and Belarus.

Other entry information

Wild cards

Source:

Protected ranking

Qualifiers

Lucky losers

Withdrawals

Banned list

The All England Lawn Tennis and Croquet Club declined entries from Russian and Belarusian players to The Championships 2022, stating that "in the circumstances of such unjustified and unprecedented military aggression, it would be unacceptable for the Russian regime to derive any benefits from the involvement of Russian or Belarusian players with The Championships".

On entry list

Rankings date: 16 May 2022Sources:

References

Notes

External links
 Entry List
 Draw

Women's Singles
Wimbledon Championships – Women's Singles
2022